The Dream Chemistry Award is an international competition for young scientists organized by the Institute of Organic Chemistry and Biochemistry of the Czech Academy of Sciences (IOCB Prague) and the Institute of Physical Chemistry of the Polish Academy of Sciences.

The competition was established in 2013 by Robert Hołyst and the Institute of Physical Chemistry of the PAS in Warsaw, with the next competition taking place in 2015. In 2017, IOCB Prague started co-sponsoring the event, and since then the competition has been held every year alternately in Prague and Warsaw.

The competition awards visionary projects from the field of chemistry or chemistry-related disciplines that have the ambition and potential to change the world for the better. The contest is for scientists who are younger than 38 years of age who have been nominated by respected experts. The winner of the contest receives a financial reward of €10,000. In addition, starting in 2019, the finalists receive a reward of €1,000.

The coordinators of the competition are Pavel Jungwirth from IOCB Prague and Robert Hołyst from the Institute of Physical Chemistry of the PAS. The members of the Honorary Committee include Josef Michl and Richard R. Schrock, the laureate of the 2005 Nobel Prize in Chemistry.

Recipients

2020 
Winner:

 Claudia Bonfio (MRC Laboratory of Molecular Biology and University of Cambridge, UK), Project: Unlocking Primitive Chemical Messages

Finalists:

 Ivana Drienovska (Vrije Universiteit Amsterdam, The Netherlands), Project: New-to-Nature Reactivities in Biocatalysis: A Closer Look at Enzymatic Fluorination
 Pawel Dydio (Universite de Strasbourg, ISIS, France), Project: Artificial Intelligence for Sustainable Chemistry of the Future
 Christopher Hendon (University of Oregon, USA), Project: A Chemical Fix for Bad Beverages
 Yunyan Qiu (Northwestern University, USA), Project: Achieving the Holy Grail of Polymer Synthesis Using Catalytic Artificial Molecular Machines

2019 
Winner: 

 Yujia Qing (University of Oxford, United Kingdom), Project: Sequencing life

Finalists: 

 Emiliano Cortés (Ludwig Maximilian University in Munich, Germany)
 Jeffrey D. Martell (University of Wisconsin-Madison, WI, USA)
 Hannes Mikula (Vienna University of Technology, Austria)
 Yoeri van de Burgt (Eindhoven University of Technology, Netherlands)

2018 
Winner: 

 Eric D. Głowacki (Linköping University, Sweden), Project: Abundant organic catalysts for a peroxide clean energy cycle

Finalists: 

 Lorenzo Albertazzi (Eindhoven University of Technology, Netherlands)
 Jeremy Luterbacher (Ecole Polytechnique Federale de Lausanne, Switzerland)
 Michael Saliba (Université de Fribourg, Switzerland)
 Alex K. Shalek (Massachusetts Institute of Technology, Cambridge, MA, USA)

2017 
Winner: 

 Jessica R. Kramer (University of Utah, Salt Lake City, UT, USA), Project: Glycocalyx engineering to probe the role of mucins in cancer

Finalists: 

 Rob Ameloot (Katholieke Universiteit Leuven, Belgium), 
 Justin Chalker (Flinders University, Adelaide, Australia), 
 Nathan Crook (Washington University in St. Louis, MO, USA), 
 Yogesh Surendranath (Massachusetts Institute of Technology, Cambridge, MA, USA)

2015 

 Winner: 
 Mircea Dincă (Massachusetts Institute of Technology, Cambridge, MA, USA), Project: A panacea for catalysis?

Finalists: 

 Denis Menshykau (Bayer Technology Services, Leverkusen, Germany)
 Eric D. Głowacki (Linköping University, Sweden)
 Yogesh Surendranath (Massachusetts Institute of Technology, Cambridge, MA, USA)
 Jiayin Yuan (Max Planck Institute of Colloids and Interfaces, Potsdam, Germany)

2013 
Winner: 

 Evan Spruijt (University of Oxford, United Kingdom), Project: The dream of life

Finalists: 

 Hal Alper (University of Texas at Austin, TX, USA)
 Peggy P. K. Lo (City University of Hong Kong, China)
 Eugen Andreiadis (Atomic Energy and Alternative Energies Commission, Gif-sur-Yvette, France)
 Paul Blainey (Massachusetts Institute of Technology, Cambridge, MA, USA)

References

External links 

 Dream Chemistry Award Website

Chemistry awards
International competitions